"La genesi del tuo colore" is a song by Italian singer Irama. It was released on 4 March 2021 by Warner Records.

The song premiered on the second evening of the Sanremo Music Festival 2021 and it ranked fifth at the end of the competition. Originally the song was supposed to be premiered on the first time, but after one of the artist's collaborators tested positive for the COVID-19 virus, the presentation was postponed to the next evening after the artist underwent a molecular swab. Despite the singer's negative test result, on the next day a further collaborator is resulted positive for the virus, forcing all the Irama's staff to a mandatory two-week quarantine.

Given the regulations of the event, the artist should have withdrawn from the festival but, thanks to the intervention of Amadeus, host and artistic director of Sanremo 2021, Irama was allowed to participate with pre-recorded performances during dress rehearsals.

Music video
The music video for "La genesi del tuo colore", directed by Gianluigi Carella, was released after the Sanremo premiere via Irama's YouTube channel. It was recorded at the Autodromo Nazionale di Monza, in the city where Irama grew up.

Track listing

Charts

Certifications

References

2021 songs
2021 singles
Sanremo Music Festival songs
Songs written by Dario Faini
Warner Records singles